The Persian Gulf Studies Center abbreviated to PGSC, is an Institute of historical, geographical, geopolitical and strategic studies of the Persian gulf and Arabian Sea. This study center is a Non Governmental Organization independent and is and managed by voluntary scholars and researches in Iran.

Publications

The center has published many books, atlases and articles in Persian, English and Arabic also held seminars and festivals.

Maps
Documents on the Persian Gulf's name

See also
 Persian Gulf
 Iranian Studies
 History of Iran
 Persian Gulf naming dispute
 The Sharmin and Bijan Mossavar-Rahmani Center for Iran and Persian Gulf Studies
 Persian Gulf Online Organization

References

External links
 Persian gulf maps
 Documents on the Persian Gulf's name Embassy of the Islamic Republic of Iran - Tokyo- A book and atlas

Iranian studies
Middle Eastern studies
Research institutes in Iran
2008 establishments in Iran
Reformist political groups in Iran
Political research institutes
Think tanks based in Iran
Non-profit organisations based in Iran
Charities based in Iran
Islamic studies
Arab studies
Middle Eastern studies journals
United States–Middle Eastern relations
Central Asian studies